La Poste du Togo is the company responsible for postal service in Togo.

Togo is a member of the West African Postal Conference.

References 

Companies of Togo
Togo
Postal system of Togo
Philately of Togo